Flordon railway station served the village of Flordon, Norfolk. It was opened in 1849, when the line from London Liverpool Street to Norwich Victoria was constructed; the station was served by Eastern Union Railway stopping services between Norwich and Ipswich. It was closed in 1966, as a result of the Beeching Axe, along with other smaller stations between Norwich and Ipswich.  The line through the former station site continues to operate today, hosting electric inter-city services between London Liverpool Street and Norwich.

Former services

Flordon station was built as a stop on the Eastern Union Railway service between Ipswich and Norwich Victoria.

References

External links
 Flordon station on navigable 1946 O. S. map

Disused railway stations in Norfolk
Former Great Eastern Railway stations
Railway stations in Great Britain opened in 1849
Railway stations in Great Britain closed in 1966
1849 establishments in England